Beit HaGadi (lit. House of the Gad) is a religious moshav in southern Israel. Located near Netivot and the Gaza Strip, it falls under the jurisdiction of Sdot Negev Regional Council.

History
The village was established in 1951, and was initially named Beit HaGide'a. The founders were demobilised IDF soldiers who were members of Netiv BeMoledet organisation and Hapoel HaMizrachi. They were immigrants from Hungary and Romania, and had previously worked in Rishon LeZion.

Its name is taken from the Tribe of Gad, which lived in the area in biblical times, and the Bedouin village of Bit Hajadaa that appears on the Madaba Map.

References

External links
Beit HaGadi Negev Information Centre

Moshavim
Religious Israeli communities
Populated places established in 1951
Populated places in Southern District (Israel)
1951 establishments in Israel
Hungarian-Jewish culture in Israel
Romanian-Jewish culture in Israel